The fifth season of the TV Land original sitcom Hot in Cleveland premiered on March 26, 2014 with the series' second live episode. It consisted of 24 episodes. The series stars Valerie Bertinelli, Wendie Malick, Jane Leeves, and Betty White.

Cast

Main
 Valerie Bertinelli as Melanie Moretti
 Jane Leeves as Rejoyla "Joy" Scroggs
 Wendie Malick as Victoria Chase
 Betty White as Elka Ostrovsky

Recurring
 Georgia Engel as Mamie Sue Johnson
 Dave Foley as Bob
 Craig Ferguson as Simon
 John Mahoney as Roy / Rusty Banks
 Bill Bellamy as Councilman Powell
 Tim Daly as Mitch
 Dan Lauria as J.J.

Special guest stars
 Alex Trebek as Narrator
 Cedric the Entertainer as Reverend Boyce
 Ken Jeong as Dr. Kang
 Thomas Lennon as Agent Gilmore
 Jaime Pressly as Kelly
 Susan Lucci as herself
 Jennifer Love Hewitt as Emmy Chase
 Cheri Oteri as Dr. Deb
 Kirstie Alley as Maddie Banks
 Chevy Chase as Ross
 Rob Schneider as Chill
 Juliet Mills as Philipa Scroggs
 Morgan Fairchild as Claudia / Elka
 Chris Colfer as Tony Chase
 Steven Tyler as Steven Tyler (voice)
 Queen Latifah as Aunt Esther Jean Johnson
 Perez Hilton as Teddy
 Debra Monk as Loretta Moretti
 Carl Reiner as Max
 Marion Ross as Olga
 Chris Harrison as himself
 Stephen Root as Brian

Guest stars
 Constance Zimmer as Lily
 D.W. Moffett as Chester
 Albert Tsai as Scout
 Jay Harrington as Alec
 Michael McMillian as Owen
 Angela Kinsey as Mrs. Carson
 Matt Iseman as Mike
 Laird Macintosh as Ram
 Larry Miller as Larry
 Chris Elliott as Luke
 Jason Priestley as Corey Chambers
 Richard Ruccolo as Matt
 Sarah Hyland as Ivy
 Max Greenfield as Doug
 Chris Isaak as Chase Jackson
 Tommy Dewey as Todd
 Kelly Schumann as Sally
 Eric Allan Kramer as Milo
 Mark Valley as Jason
 Edward Hibbert as Collin Brett
 Jamie Denbo as Julie
 John Ross Bowie as Benny
 J.P. Manoux as Nate
 Maggie Wheeler as Rachel
 Harry Van Gorkum as Daniel
 Nora Dunn as Elizabeth / Victoria
 Steve Valentine as Jay / Joy
 Emily Rutherfurd as Jodie / Melanie
 Coby Bell as Baz
 Dan Castellaneta as Dr. McNally
 Sam Daly as Justin
 Lance Barber as Tyler
 David Kaye as Narrator (voice)
 Dee Bradley Baker as George Clooney the Dog (voice)
 Jim Meskimen as Robert Redford & Quasimodo (voice)
 Cedric Yarbrough as LeBron (voice)
 Craig Bierko as Donald
 Will Sasso as Frankie
 Anita Barone as Lisa
 Andrew Leeds as Tom
 Nicole Parker as Jessica
 Andrew Friedman as Dr. Rayner
 Mac Brandt as Mac
 Romy Rosemont as Marcie
 Luke Perry as Trevor

Production
On March 20, 2013, TV Land renewed Hot In Cleveland for a fifth season. Production of the fifth season began on September 16, 2013, and premiered on March 26, 2014 with their second special live episode. Season five also featured the 100th episode, titled "Win Win" which filmed on May 2, 2014, and a cross-over episode with fellow TV Land series Kirstie where the girls visit New York City and run into Kirstie Alley's character Maddie Banks, who is Victoria's former roommate. This season also had a special animated episode, titled "The Animated Episode", that featured homages to Willy Wonka & The Chocolate Factory, The Walking Dead, and Frankenstein.

Guest stars for this season include: Jason Priestley as Corey Chambers, a movie star that Melanie had a crush on in high school, Thomas Lennon as a by-the-book FBI agent, who investigates the disappearance of Victoria's husband and has a profound effect on the ladies, Chris Elliott as Luke, Elka's new laid-back boyfriend, Sarah Hyland as Ivy, an actress who threatens Victoria's chances of an Oscar nomination, Tim Daly as Mitch Turner, the new owner of the detective agency where Joy works, Chevy Chase as Ross Barkley, a man with a deep dark secret who goes on a date with Melanie, Max Greenfield as a con man who poses as a pet adoption consultant, Nora Dunn, Emily Rutherfurd and Morgan Fairchild as actresses cast in Elka's new play about herself, Angela Kinsey as the Headmistress of a pre-school that Joy wants to get her grandson into, and Chris Isaak as Melanie's favorite singer.
Bill Bellamy has a recurring role this season as Councilman Powell, Elka's opponent for a Cleveland City Council seat. Previously recurring guest stars returning for season five include: Jennifer Love Hewitt, Susan Lucci, Craig Ferguson, John Mahoney, Michael McMillian, Jay Harrington, Dave Foley, Georgia Engel, Juliet Mills and Carl Reiner.

Release
Season five was released in Region 1 on November 4, 2014. The DVD includes all 24 episodes on 3 discs.

Episodes

References 

General references 
 
 
 

2014 American television seasons
Hot in Cleveland seasons